The Addis Ababa Light Rail (Amharic: የአዲስ አበባ ቀላል ባቡር; Ye’Adīsi Abeba k’elali Baburi)  is a light rail system in Addis Ababa, Ethiopia. It is the first light rail and rapid transit in eastern and sub-saharan Africa.

A  line running from the city centre to industrial areas in the south of the city was opened on 20 September 2015 and inaugurated by Prime Minister Hailemariam Desalegn. Service began on 9 November 2015 for the second line (west-east).

The railway was contracted by China Railway Group Limited. The Ethiopian Railways Corporation began construction of the double-track electrified light rail transit project in December 2011 after securing funds from the Export-Import Bank of China. Trial operations were begun on 1 February 2015, with several months of testing following that.  It is operated by the Shenzhen Metro Group.

Overview

Of the two line rail lines, the east-west line extends , stretching from Ayat Village to Torhailoch, and passing through Megenagna, Meskel Square, Legehar and Mexico Square. The common track is the elevated section that runs east to west across the southern edge of the CBD from Meskel Square to Mexico Square, and onwards to Lideta. Trains on the north-south line are blue and white, whilst on the east-west line they are green and white. The Fares cost 2-6 Ethiopian birr. Tickets are bought at orange-coloured kiosks next to each station.

The final cost to build the railway was US$475m, with construction taking three years. The Addis Ababa Light Rail was originally to have a total of 41 stations on its two lines, and each train was planned to have the capacity to carry 286 passengers. This will enable the light rail transit to provide a transportation service to 15,000 passengers per hour per direction (PPHPD) and 60,000 in all four directions. The railway lines have their dedicated power grid.

According to CREC, the system carried an average of 113,500 daily passengers in January 2016 with 153,000 passengers as the highest passenger load during a single day. Service frequency was 10 minutes during peak hours on both lines and 20 minutes during off-peak hours. On average there were 94 train rotations on the Blue line (3,177.2 vehicle-kilometres) and 93 rotations on the Green line (3,236.4 vehicle-kilometres).

Future expansion 

There are plans for extensions in all four directions. According to Getachew Betru, CEO of Ethiopian Railway Corporation, the Ethiopian government indicated that any new line built should be completely grade-separated. Apart from extending the existing lines, two new lines are under consideration by the Ethiopian government. The first one will start at St. George's Cathedral, pass along Mexico Square to the African Union Headquarters and will terminate at Lebu, connecting to the new national rail network. The second line will start at Megenagna Roundabout and passes via Bole Airport, Wello Sefer area, Saris market area and Jommo area and terminates at Lebu.

Rolling stock 

Addis Ababa Light Rail initially operated a fleet of 41 three-section 70% low-floor trams manufactured by CNR Changchun (and based on the design for Shenyang Modern Tram). By 2023, only 17 trains were in service, with the rest "inoperable due to lack of spare parts".

Lines

Blue Line 
 Open 20 September 2015. 
 The  Blue Line runs south from Menelik Square to Kaliti with 22 stops (including the common section). There are three planned stops.

Common section 
 Open 20 September 2015. 
 The  common section runs from St. Lideta to Meskel Square, with 5 stops.

Green Line 
 Open 9 November 2015.
 The  Green Line runs east from Ayat to Tor Hailoch, with 23 stops (including the common section). There are five planned stops.

See also 
 
 List of tram and light rail transit systems

References

External links 

 Project presentation
 Addis Ababa at UrbanRail.Net
 Addis Train (Android App)
 Addis Ababa Light Rail Transit Map

Light Rail
Light rail in Ethiopia
Rapid transit in Ethiopia
Rail transport in Ethiopia
750 V DC railway electrification
Railway lines opened in 2015
2015 establishments in Ethiopia